Independence Township is a former township of Pope County, Arkansas. It was located in the northeastern part of the county.

Cities, towns, and villages
 Nogo

References
 United States Board on Geographic Names (GNIS)
 United States National Atlas

External links
 US-Counties.com

Townships in Pope County, Arkansas
Townships in Arkansas